Farmdale may refer to:
Farmdale, Ohio
Farmdale, West Virginia
Farmdale (Los Angeles Metro station)